is a railway station on the Seibu Ikebukuro Line in Nerima, Tokyo, Japan, operated by the private railway operator Seibu Railway.

Lines
Only all-stations "Local" services stop at this station.

Station layout
The station consists of an elevated (third-floor level) island platform serving the two tracks, with an additional outer track on either side for non-stop services. The ticket gates are on the second floor level, and the two exits (North and South) are on the first (ground) floor level. The North exit leads to a forecourt for buses and taxis.

Platforms

History
The station opened on December 7, 1994. Through services to the Tokyo Metro began on March 26, 1998.

Station numbering was introduced on all Seibu Railway lines during fiscal 2012, with Nerima-Takanodai Station becoming "SI09".

Passenger statistics
In fiscal 2013, the station was the 40th busiest on the Seibu network with an average of 25,930 passengers daily.

The passenger figures for previous years are as shown below.

References

External links

 Nerima-Takanodai Station information (Seibu Railway) 

Railway stations in Japan opened in 1994
Seibu Ikebukuro Line
Railway stations in Tokyo